Lönkytin is an island in the Finnish sector of the Bay of Bothnia, off shore from the town of Haukipudas.

Description
Lönkytin is a high, rocky islet.
The island has a radar reflector.

The second-closest island to the east is Satakarinletto.

References

Finnish islands in the Baltic
Landforms of North Ostrobothnia